Neunkirchen is a town and a municipality in Saarland, Germany. It is the largest town in, and the seat of the district of Neunkirchen. It is situated on the river Blies, approx. 20 km northeast of Saarbrücken. With about 50,000 inhabitants, Neunkirchen is Saarland's second largest city.

Overview
The name of the town derives from "An der neuen Kirche" meaning "by the new church" not from "nine churches" as one might be tempted to assume.  In the past, Neunkirchen's economy has been shaped almost exclusively by coal and steel. With the decline of this industry sector, Neunkirchen's economy had to face drastic changes and underwent a significant shift towards the service and retail sector, although smaller industries still remain.

History

Early history

The earliest settlements in the area can be dated back to 700 BC. The oldest part of the town is the village of Wiebelskirchen north of the town centre; its name has been recorded as early as 765 AD and is thus the oldest Christian name in town ("Kirche" means church). The name "Neunkirchen" is recorded for the first time in 1281.

Neunkirchen belonged to the principality of Nassau-Saarbrücken, who erected two castles nearby (which do not exist any more today, but the ruins of one of them are the base of a little park-like area.

The famous German poet, geologist and author Johann Wolfgang von Goethe visited Neunkirchen and described the Castle and the Ironworks.

Weimar Republic
Neunkirchen was awarded township as late as 1922 after having been the largest village in Prussia for some time.

Nazi era and World War II
On 10 February 1933, an explosion of a giant gas tank at the ironwork caused 68 casualties, 190 injured. The damage spread over a part of the factory and also hit a nearby residential area and a school building. The duration of repair work and temporary closing of the damaged parts of the iron works was about nine months. This event caused worldwide media attention.

Having a big ironworks complex right in the town centre made the town a target for Allied bomb raids in the Second World War. In 1945, an air raid destroyed about three quarters of the town centre. Due to that, there are many malfunctioning WW2 bombs that didn't explode and can be found even today.

Post World War II
On September 10, 1987, General Secretary of the Socialist Unity Party Erich Honecker visited his birthplace Neunkirchen.

Economy
There are traces of surface coal mining that reach back as far as 700BC.  Later on, coal was mined underground until 1968.  In 1593, the first ironworks were constructed in the Blies valley. The iron ore used was from local origin.

Much of the city's fate was influenced by the von Stumm-Halberg family, who owned the local ironworks from 1806 onwards, and thus had enormous influence on the local politics.

Due to the decline of the coal and steel industry, the local economy faced aggravating hardships. With the last coal mine closing down in 1968 and the major part of the ironworks complex closing down in 1982 (only a steel-mill is still in service today), the unemployment rate rose drastically.

Meanwhile, the city has transformed into a "shopping town", a process that had been started with the construction of a large shopping centre on the grounds of the former steelworks.

Remnants of the former steelworks that had not been destroyed meanwhile have been preserved and renovated. They now serve as an industrial monument; parts of them feature small pubs, clubs, a cinema, the first of the German branch of Hooters of America, Inc restaurants and a radio studio of the McDonald's fast food chain.

Twin towns – sister cities

Neunkirchen is twinned with:
 Lübben, Germany
 Mantes-la-Ville, France
 Wolsztyn, Poland

Notable people

Julius Adler (1894–1945), politician, Member of Reichstag (KPD)
Walter Rilla (1894–1980), actor
Erich Honecker (1912–1994), Leader of East Germany 1976–1989 
Karl Rawer (1913–2018), physicist
Karl Ferdinand Werner (1924–2008), historian
Wolfgang Kermer (born 1935), art historian, artist, author, professor, rector State Academy of Fine Arts Stuttgart (1971–1984)
Stefan Kuntz (born 1962), football player and coach
Thomas Hayo (born 1969), advertiser
Alexandra Kertz-Welzel (born 1970), Professor of Music Education at LMU Munich
Shanta Ghosh (born 1975), athlete
Tobias Hans (born 1978), politician (CDU), Minister President of Saarland
Nora-Eugenie Gomringer (born 1980), Swiss-German poet and writer
Johannes Wurtz (born 1992), footballer

References

External links

 

 
Towns in Saarland
Neunkirchen (German district)